Hanzhuang Township is a township of Beishi District, in the northeastern outskirts of Baoding, Hebei, People's Republic of China. , it has 20 villages under its administration.In 1962, Tangut dharani pillars was discovered here.

See also
List of township-level divisions of Hebei

References

Township-level divisions of Hebei
Lianchi District